Eduardo "Lalo" Fernández Lopez (born December 16, 1992) is a Mexican footballer who plays as a goalkeeper. Fernandez has dual citizenship with Mexico and the United States.

Career
On January 9, 2012, Fernández signed as a Home Grown Player with Real Salt Lake.

Fernández was loaned to USL Pro club Phoenix FC in July 2013 and made his professional debut on July 12, 2013, against Antigua Barracuda FC.

On September 5, 2017, Fernández signed for Liga MX side Tigres UANL.

Personal
His father, Eduardo, was also a professional footballer playing as a goalkeeper in the Mexican first division.

Honours
Real Monarchs
 USL Championship Regular Season Title: 2017

UANL
 Liga MX: Apertura 2017, Clausura 2019

References

External links
Real Salt Lake profile

1992 births
Living people
Mexican expatriate footballers
Mexican footballers
Homegrown Players (MLS)
Real Salt Lake players
Phoenix FC players
Real Monarchs players
Tigres UANL footballers
Association football goalkeepers
Footballers from Guadalajara, Jalisco
Expatriate soccer players in the United States
USL Championship players